Alkadar is a rural locality (a selo) and the administrative centre of Alkadarsky Selsoviet, Suleyman-Stalsky District, Republic of Dagestan, Russia. The population was 970 as of 2010. There are 36 streets.

Geography 
Alkadar is located on the left bank of the Chiragchay River, 6 km northwest of Kasumkent (the district's administrative centre) by road. Kurkent and Sardarkent are the nearest rural localities.

Population 
The village is composed of ethnic Lezgins. There is a house-museum of Mirza Hasan Alkadari, Islamic scholar and historian.

References 

Rural localities in Suleyman-Stalsky District